Stephen Woodworth may refer to 

Stephen Woodworth (author), American author
Stephen Woodworth (politician), Canadian politician

See also
 Steven E. Woodworth (born 1961), American historian